The Municipality of Ribnica na Pohorju is a municipality in the traditional region of Styria in northeastern Slovenia. It is also part of the larger Carinthia Statistical Region. The seat of the municipality is the town of Ribnica na Pohorju. Ribnica na Pohorju became a municipality in 1998.

Settlements
In addition to the municipal seat of Ribnica na Pohorju, the municipality also includes the following settlements:
 Hudi Kot
 Josipdol
 Zgornja Orlica
 Zgornji Janževski Vrh
 Zgornji Lehen na Pohorju

Demographics
[From 2002 census]

1,254 people counted. Of these, 1,168 of them had an ethnicity listed. 1,165 Slovenes. 3 others.

References

External links

Municipality of  Ribnica na Pohorju on Geopedia
Municipality of Ribnica na Pohorju website

Ribnica na Pohorju
Carinthia (Slovenia)
1998 establishments in Slovenia